Broadway After Midnight, also known as Gangsters on Broadway, is a 1927 American silent crime melodrama film directed by Fred Windemere and written by Frederic Bartel and Adele Buffington. The film stars Matthew Betz, Priscilla Bonner, Cullen Landis, Gareth Hughes, and Ernest Hilliard. The film was released on October 29, 1927 by Krelbar Pictures.

Cast
Matthew Betz as Quill Burke 
Priscilla Bonner as Queenie Morgan / Gloria Livingston 
Cullen Landis as Jimmy Crestmore 
Gareth Hughes as Billy Morgan
Ernest Hilliard as Bodo Lambert
Barbara Tennant
William H. Turner
Hank Mann
Paul Weigel

Preservation
The film is now considered lost.

References

External links

1927 crime films
1927 films
Melodrama films
American crime films
American silent feature films
American black-and-white films
Lost American films
Films directed by Fred Windemere
1927 lost films
Lost crime films
1920s American films
Silent American drama films